It's A Hard Truth Ain't It is a 2018 documentary film by Madeleine Sackler, Dennis Brown, Franklin Cox, Brandon Crider, Clifford Elswick, Joseph Henderson, Herb Robertson, Rushawn Tanksley, Marshaun Bugg, Al'jonon Coleman, James Collins, Quentis Hardiman, Charles Lawrence, and Mark Thacker.

It is the first widely released film co-directed by people who are incarcerated. The film is a documentary in which 13 men in prison study film making with filmmaker Madeleine Sackler to tell their own stories. Sackler's fiction film, O.G., was in part inspired by the work done for this documentary; many of the co-directors in It's  A Hard Truth Ain't It also appear in O.G. 

It's A Hard Truth Ain't It was nominated for an Emmy Award in the Outstanding Arts and Culture Documentary category.

Animated portrayals of the men's memories were created by Yoni Goodman.

The film and O.G. were both acquired by HBO after premiering at the Tribeca Film Festival.

References

External links 
Hard Truth Film
Great Curve Films

2018 films
HBO Films films
2018 documentary films
2010s English-language films